The 17th Maccabiah Games, held in Israel, were an incarnation of the 'Jewish Olympics.' They attracted the largest attendance of any Maccabiah Games, including more than 900 representatives from the United States, almost 500 from Australia, and more than 2,000 from Israel, bringing the total participants to more than 7,700 from 55 countries.

Israel ended the games at the top of the medal count with 228 gold medals.  The United States was second with 71 gold medals, while Russia came in third with 15.

History
The Maccabiah Games were first held in 1932. In 1961, they were declared a "Regional Sports Event" by, and under the auspices and supervision of, the International Olympic Committee. Among other Olympic and world champions, swimmer Mark Spitz won 10 Maccabiah gold medals before earning his first of nine Olympic gold medals.

Notable competitors

In fencing, Vadim Gutzeit of Ukraine, an Olympic gold medal winner in team sabre, won gold medals in individual and team sabre. Two-time Olympic gold medal winner Sergey Sharikov of Russia won the silver medal in sabre. Two-time Pan American Games gold medalist Dan Kellner won the silver medal in foil for the US, as he was defeated by Israel's Tomer Or.  Soren Thompson, former US Junior Champion, NCAA Fencing Champion, and future team world epee champion, won a team silver medal in epee for the US.

In swimming, American Olympic champion Scott Goldblatt won gold medals in the 4x100 freestyle relay and the 4x200 freestyle relay, a silver medal in the 200m freestyle, and a bronze medal in the 100m freestyle. American Daniel Madwed won a gold medal and set a new Maccabiah Games record in the men's 200-meter butterfly. Israeli Yoav Gath won gold medals in both the 100 m and 200 m backstroke, setting a new Maccabiah record in the 200. Israeli Olympian  Michael Halika won a gold medal in the 400 m medley, setting a Maccabiah record. Israeli Olympian Anna Gostomelsky won the women's 100m freestyle, and set a new Maccabiah record.

In women's tennis, Sharon Fichman of Canada—after defeating Israeli Julia Glushko in the semi-finals—won the gold medal at the age of 14, and also won a bronze medal in the women’s doubles, and a silver medal in mixed doubles.

In women's basketball, Shay Doron, who two years later signed with the WNBA New York Liberty, led the USA to a 5–0 record and a gold medal, and was selected Maccabiah MVP. In men's basketball, Guy Pnini (who was named tournament MVP) and Team Israel won a gold medal.

In squash, Brian L. Roberts, the Chairman and CEO of Comcast Corporation, won a gold medal with the US team in his fourth Maccabiah.

In soccer, Jonathan Bornstein, Benny Feilhaber, Leo Krupnik, Matt Reiswerg, Kyle Altman, Michael Erush, Jordan Gruber, and Kevin Friedland led the US men's open soccer to their best finish ever with a silver medal.
 The US lost to gold medal winner Israel, which played with their U-20 National Team, which included Itay Shechter, Yuval Spungin, and Shmuel Kozokin. Tomer Chencinski and Felix Gelt represented Canada in soccer. At age 18, Samuel Scheimann represented the Netherlands at the Games in football. At the age of 13, Nick Blackman competed in the Games as part of a British schools football team.

In karate, the US Men's open team took several gold and silver medals. The youth team took one silver and one bronze. In judo, 17-year-old Alice Schlesinger won a gold medal by defeating the world champion and former Israeli Daniella Krakower in the final. Canadian future Olympian Josh Binstock competed in volleyball.

Russian grandmaster and future European champion Evgeniy Najer won a gold medal in chess, as Israeli grandmaster Ilya Smirin won a silver medal.

Participating communities
Not all Jewish communities participated in the 2005 Maccabiah, as has been the case since 1950.  Jewish communities in Arab countries (Morocco, Tunisia, etc.), as well as the community in Iran, did not send delegations.  The number in parentheses indicates the number of participants that community contributed.

 
  Argentina
  Australia (500)
  Azerbaijan
  Belarus
  Belgium
  Bolivia
  Bulgaria
  Brazil
  Canada
  Chile
  China
  Colombia
  Costa Rica
  Croatia
  Cyprus
  Czech Republic
  Denmark
  Finland
  France
  Georgia
  Germany
  Greece
  Guatemala
  Hungary
  India
  Israel (2,000)
  Italy
  Latvia
  Lithuania
  Luxembourg
  Republic of Macedonia
  Mexico
  Moldova
  Netherlands
  New Zealand
  Panama
  Paraguay
  Peru
  Poland
  Portugal
  Romania
  Russia
  Serbia
  Singapore
  Slovakia
  Spain
  South Africa
  Sweden
  Switzerland
  Turkey
  Ukraine
  United Kingdom
  United States (900)
  Uruguay
  Venezuela

Medal count

Sports
The sports featured at the 2005 Maccabiah Games are listed below.

 
Badminton
Baseball
Basketball
Cricket
Fencing
Field hockey
Football
Futsal
Golf
Gymnastics
Karate
Lawn Bowling
Rowing
Rugby union
Softball
Squash
Swimming
Taekwondo
Ten pin Bowling
Tennis
Track & Field
Triathlon
Volleyball
Water polo
Wrestling

Footnotes

External links
Official
 Maccabiah XVII

Unofficial
 Summaries of each of the Games
 Jewish virtual library 
 "The 17th Maccabiah Games – July 2005"
 “The Miracle in Israel”

 
Maccabiah Games
Macca
Maccabiah Games
2000s in Tel Aviv